The Saybrook Platform was a new constitution for the Congregational church in Connecticut in 1708. Religious and civic leaders in Connecticut around 1700 were distressed by the colony-wide decline in personal religious piety and in church discipline.  The colonial legislature took action by calling 12 ministers and four laymen to meet in Saybrook, Connecticut; eight were Yale trustees. They prepared fifteen articles that theologically put the church in the Westminster theological tradition. It rejected extreme localism or "congregationalism" that had been inherited from England, replacing it with a centralized system similar to what the Presbyterians had.  The Congregational church was now to be led by local ministerial associations and consociations composed of ministers and lay leaders from a specific geographical area. A colony-wide General Assembly had final authority.  Instead of the congregation from each local church selecting its minister, the associations now had the responsibility to examine candidates for the ministry, and to oversee a behavior of the ministers.  The consociations (where laymen were powerless) could impose discipline on specific churches and judge disputes that arose.  

The result was a centralization of power that bothered many local church activists.  However the official associations responded by disfellowshipping churches that refused to comply.  The system worked for 150 years, guaranteeing orthodox Puritanism. The Platform was conservative victory against a non-conformist tide which had begun with the Halfway Covenant and would culminate in the Great Awakening.  Similar proposals for more centralized clerical control of local churches were defeated in Massachusetts, where a much more liberal theology flourished.  The Platform facilitated close ties with the Presbyterians; Connecticut Yankees who moved West founded Presbyterian churches.  <ref> Sydney E.  Ahlstrom, A religious history of the American people (1972) pp 163-6, 267, 290 </ref>

See also
Cambridge Platform
Plan of Union of 1801

Notes

Primary sources
  H. Shelton Smith, Robert T Handy and Lefferts A Loetscher, eds. American Christianity: An Historical Interpretation With Representative Documents, Vol. 1: 1607-1820'' (1960) pp 226-29 has the text

1708 in the Thirteen Colonies
Congregationalism
Connecticut Colony
Deep River, Connecticut